Patrick Rylands (born in Hull, 1943) is an English designer.

After graduating in ceramics from the Royal College of Art in London in 1966 began to work as a freelancer with a number of iconic toy companies (Creative Playthings, Naef, Ambi Toys).

In 1970 he became the youngest designer to be awarded the prestigious Prince Philip Designers Prize for a group of ABS plastic toys designed for the British company Trendon Toys (former producer of Sasha dolls).
From 1976 up until 2002 he worked as in-house designer for the historic Dutch toy company, Ambi Toys. In 1999 he was awarded the title of Royal Designer for Industry.

His toy designs are part of the permanent collection at the Victoria and Albert Museum of Childhood in London and have been exhibited in the Olympic Games of London 2012.

References 

1943 births
Date of birth missing (living people)
People from Kingston upon Hull
Living people
English designers
Toy inventors
People associated with the Royal College of Art